Carol Ann Conboy (born July 10, 1947) is an American lawyer, former teacher, and former justice of the New Hampshire Supreme Court.

Education
She graduated from the University of Connecticut with a Bachelor of Arts in 1969 and from the Franklin Pierce Law Center, now known as University of New Hampshire School of Law with a Juris Doctor in 1978.

Military service
After graduating from the University of Connecticut, she joined the United States Air Force and went to Officer Training School at Lackland Air Force Base in Texas. She was commissioned as an officer and served in Boston during the Vietnam War era until resigning her commission as a First Lieutenant in 1971.

Teaching career
She taught English at Merrimack Valley High School in Penacook and Southside Junior High School in Manchester.

Law career
From 1978 to 1979, she clerked for Judge Shane Devine, the former Chief Judge of the New Hampshire Federal District Court. From 1980 to 1992, she was a partner in the New Hampshire law firm of McLane, Graf, Raulerson and Middleton. From 1992 to 2009, she served as a Judge on the New Hampshire Superior Court.

While on the Superior Court, she was a Supervisory Justice of the Merrimack County Superior Court and served as Chair of the New Hampshire Supreme Court Advisory Committee on Judicial Ethics, and Chair of the New Hampshire Superior Court Sentence Review Board.

In 2009, Governor John Lynch nominated her to serve as an associate justice on the New Hampshire Supreme Court. She was sworn in on July 8, 2009 and served on the court until her retirement on July 1, 2017.

Personal life
Carol married Edward J. Conboy while in the Air Force. Together they had three children (Thomas, Paul, and David). Edward passed away on April 15, 2009.

References

1947 births
Living people
United States Air Force officers
20th-century American lawyers
Justices of the New Hampshire Supreme Court
American women judges
University of Connecticut alumni
University of New Hampshire School of Law alumni
20th-century American women
21st-century American women